Analog television is the original television technology that uses analog signals to transmit video and audio. In an analog television broadcast, the brightness, colors and sound are represented by amplitude, phase and frequency of an analog signal.

Analog signals vary over a continuous range of possible values which means that electronic noise and interference may be introduced.  Thus with analog, a moderately weak signal becomes snowy and subject to interference.  In contrast, picture quality from a digital television (DTV) signal remains good until the signal level drops below a threshold where reception is no longer possible or becomes intermittent.

Analog television may be wireless (terrestrial television and satellite television) or can be distributed over a cable network as cable television.

All broadcast television systems used analog signals before the arrival of DTV.  Motivated by the lower bandwidth requirements of compressed digital signals, beginning in the 2000s, a digital television transition is proceeding in most countries of the world, with different deadlines for the cessation of analog broadcasts.

Development

The earliest systems of analog television were mechanical television systems that used spinning disks with patterns of holes punched into the disc to scan an image.  A similar disk reconstructed the image at the receiver.  Synchronization of the receiver disc rotation was handled through sync pulses broadcast with the image information.  Camera systems used similar spinning discs and required intensely bright illumination of the subject for the light detector to work.  The reproduced images from these mechanical systems were dim, very low resolution and flickered severely.  

Analog television did not really begin as an industry until the development of the cathode-ray tube (CRT), which uses a focused electron beam to trace lines across a phosphor coated surface.  The electron beam could be swept across the screen much faster than any mechanical disc system, allowing for more closely spaced scan lines and much higher image resolution.  Also, far less maintenance was required of an all-electronic system compared to a mechanical spinning disc system.  All-electronic systems became popular with households after World War II.

Standards

Broadcasters of analog television encode their signal using different systems.  The official systems of transmission were defined by the ITU in 1961 as: A, B, C, D, E, F, G, H, I, K, K1, L, M and N. These systems determine the number of scan lines, frame rate, channel width, video bandwidth, video-audio separation, and so on.  A color encoding scheme (NTSC, PAL, or SECAM) could be added to the base monochrome signal. Using RF modulation the signal is then modulated onto a very high frequency (VHF) or ultra high frequency (UHF) carrier wave.  Each frame of a television image is composed of scan lines drawn on the screen.  The lines are of varying brightness; the whole set of lines is drawn quickly enough that the human eye perceives it as one image.  The process repeats and next sequential frame is displayed, allowing the depiction of motion.  The analog television signal contains timing and synchronization information so that the receiver can reconstruct a two-dimensional moving image from a one-dimensional time-varying signal.

The first commercial television systems were black-and-white; the beginning of color television was in the 1950s.

A practical television system needs to take luminance, chrominance (in a color system), synchronization (horizontal and vertical), and audio signals, and broadcast them over a radio transmission.  The transmission system must include a means of television channel selection.

Analog broadcast television systems come in a variety of frame rates and resolutions.  Further differences exist in the frequency and modulation of the audio carrier.  The monochrome combinations still existing in the 1950s were standardized by the International Telecommunication Union (ITU) as capital letters A through N.  When color television was introduced, the chrominance information was added to the monochrome signals in a way that black and white televisions ignore.  In this way backward compatibility was achieved.

There are three standards for the way the additional color information can be encoded and transmitted.  The first was the American NTSC system.  The European and Australian PAL and the French and former Soviet Union SECAM standards were developed later and attempt to cure certain defects of the NTSC system.  PAL's color encoding is similar to the NTSC systems.  SECAM, though, uses a different modulation approach than PAL or NTSC.  PAL had a late evolution called PALplus, allowing widescreen broadcasts while remaining fully compatible with existing PAL equipment.

In principle, all three color encoding systems can be used with any scan line/frame rate combination.  Therefore, in order to describe a given signal completely, it's necessary to quote the color system and the broadcast standard as a capital letter.  For example, the United States, Canada, Mexico and South Korea use NTSC-M, Japan uses NTSC-J, the UK uses PAL-I, France uses SECAM-L, much of Western Europe and Australia use PAL-B/G, most of Eastern Europe uses SECAM-D/K or PAL-D/K and so on.

However, not all of these possible combinations actually exist.  NTSC is currently only used with system M, even though there were experiments with NTSC-A (405 line) in the UK and NTSC-N (625 line) in part of South America.  PAL is used with a variety of 625-line standards (B, G, D, K, I, N) but also with the North American 525-line standard, accordingly named PAL-M.  Likewise, SECAM is used with a variety of 625-line standards.

For this reason, many people refer to any 625/25 type signal as PAL and to any 525/30 signal as NTSC, even when referring to digital signals; for example, on DVD-Video, which does not contain any analog color encoding, and thus no PAL or NTSC signals at all.

Although a number of different broadcast television systems were in use worldwide, the same principles of operation apply.

Displaying an image

A cathode-ray tube (CRT) television displays an image by scanning a beam of electrons across the screen in a pattern of horizontal lines known as a raster.  At the end of each line, the beam returns to the start of the next line; at the end of the last line, the beam returns to the beginning of the first line at the top of the screen.  As it passes each point, the intensity of the beam is varied, varying the luminance of that point.  A color television system is similar except there are three beams that scan together and an additional signal known as chrominance controls the color of the spot.

When analog television was developed, no affordable technology for storing video signals existed; the luminance signal had to be generated and transmitted at the same time at which it is displayed on the CRT.  It was therefore essential to keep the raster scanning in the camera (or other device for producing the signal) in exact synchronization with the scanning in the television.

The physics of the CRT require that a finite time interval be allowed for the spot to move back to the start of the next line (horizontal retrace) or the start of the screen (vertical retrace).  The timing of the luminance signal must allow for this.

The human eye has a characteristic called phi phenomenon.  Quickly displaying successive scan images creates the illusion of smooth motion.  Flickering of the image can be partially solved using a long persistence phosphor coating on the CRT so that successive images fade slowly.  However, slow phosphor has the negative side-effect of causing image smearing and blurring when there is rapid on-screen motion occurring.

The maximum frame rate depends on the bandwidth of the electronics and the transmission system, and the number of horizontal scan lines in the image.  A frame rate of 25 or 30 hertz is a satisfactory compromise, while the process of interlacing two video fields of the picture per frame is used to build the image.  This process doubles the apparent number of video frames per second and further reduces flicker and other defects in transmission.

Receiving signals
The television system for each country will specify a number of television channels within the UHF or VHF frequency ranges.  A channel actually consists of two signals: the picture information is transmitted using amplitude modulation on one carrier frequency, and the sound is transmitted with frequency modulation at a frequency at a fixed offset (typically 4.5 to 6 MHz) from the picture signal.

The channel frequencies chosen represent a compromise between allowing enough bandwidth for video (and hence satisfactory picture resolution), and allowing enough channels to be packed into the available frequency band.  In practice a technique called vestigial sideband is used to reduce the channel spacing, which would be nearly twice the video bandwidth if pure AM was used.

Signal reception is invariably done via a superheterodyne receiver: the first stage is a tuner which selects a television channel and frequency-shifts it to a fixed intermediate frequency (IF).  The signal amplifier performs amplification to the IF stages from the microvolt range to fractions of a volt.

Extracting the sound
At this point the IF signal consists of a video carrier signal at one frequency and the sound carrier at a fixed offset in frequency.  A demodulator recovers the video signal.  Also at the output of the same demodulator is a new frequency modulated sound carrier at the offset frequency.  In some sets made before 1948, this was filtered out, and the sound IF of about 22 MHz was sent to an FM demodulator to recover the basic sound signal.  In newer sets, this new carrier at the offset frequency was allowed to remain as intercarrier sound, and it was sent to an FM demodulator to recover the basic sound signal.  One particular advantage of intercarrier sound is that when the front panel fine tuning knob is adjusted, the sound carrier frequency does not change with the tuning, but stays at the above-mentioned offset frequency.  Consequently, it is easier to tune the picture without losing the sound.

So the FM sound carrier is then demodulated, amplified, and used to drive a loudspeaker.  Until the advent of the NICAM and MTS systems, television sound transmissions were monophonic.

Structure of a video signal
The video carrier is demodulated to give a composite video signal containing luminance, chrominance and synchronization signals. The result is identical to the composite video format used by analog video devices such as VCRs or CCTV cameras.  To ensure good linearity and thus fidelity, consistent with affordable manufacturing costs of transmitters and receivers, the video carrier is never modulated to the extent that it is shut off altogether.  When intercarrier sound was introduced later in 1948, not completely shutting off the carrier had the side effect of allowing intercarrier sound to be economically implemented.

Each line of the displayed image is transmitted using a signal as shown above.  The same basic format (with minor differences mainly related to timing and the encoding of color) is used for PAL, NTSC, and SECAM television systems.  A monochrome signal is identical to a color one, with the exception that the elements shown in color in the diagram (the colorburst, and the chrominance signal) are not present.

The front porch is a brief (about 1.5 microsecond) period inserted between the end of each transmitted line of picture and the leading edge of the next line's sync pulse.  Its purpose was to allow voltage levels to stabilise in older televisions, preventing interference between picture lines.  The front porch is the first component of the horizontal blanking interval which also contains the horizontal sync pulse and the back porch.

The back porch is the portion of each scan line between the end (rising edge) of the horizontal sync pulse and the start of active video.  It is used to restore the black level (300 mV) reference in analog video.  In signal processing terms, it compensates for the fall time and settling time following the sync pulse.

In color television systems such as PAL and NTSC, this period also includes the colorburst signal.  In the SECAM system, it contains the reference subcarrier for each consecutive color difference signal in order to set the zero-color reference.

In some professional systems, particularly satellite links between locations, the digital audio is embedded within the line sync pulses of the video signal, to save the cost of renting a second channel.  The name for this proprietary system is Sound-in-Syncs.

Monochrome video signal extraction
The luminance component of a composite video signal varies between 0 V and approximately 0.7 V above the black level.  In the NTSC system, there is a blanking signal level used during the front porch and back porch, and a black signal level 75 mV above it; in PAL and SECAM these are identical.

In a monochrome receiver, the luminance signal is amplified to drive the control grid in the electron gun of the CRT.  This changes the intensity of the electron beam and therefore the brightness of the spot being scanned.  Brightness and contrast controls determine the DC shift and amplification, respectively.

Color video signal extraction

U and V signals 
A color signal conveys picture information for each of the red, green, and blue components of an image.  However, these are not simply transmitted as three separate signals, because: such a signal would not be compatible with monochrome receivers, an important consideration when color broadcasting was first introduced.  It would also occupy three times the bandwidth of existing television, requiring a decrease in the number of television channels available.

Instead, the RGB signals are converted into YUV form, where the Y signal represents the luminance of the colors in the image.  Because the rendering of colors in this way is the goal of both monochrome film and television systems, the Y signal is ideal for transmission as the luminance signal.  This ensures a monochrome receiver will display a correct picture in black and white, where a given color is reproduced by a shade of gray that correctly reflects how light or dark the original color is.

The U and V signals are color difference signals.  The U signal is the difference between the B signal and the Y signal, also known as B minus Y (B-Y), and the V signal is the difference between the R signal and the Y signal, also known as R minus Y (R-Y).  The U signal then represents how purplish-blue or its complementary color, yellowish-green, the color is, and the V signal how purplish-red or it's complementary, greenish-cyan, it is.  The advantage of this scheme is that the U and V signals are zero when the picture has no color content.  Since the human eye is more sensitive to detail in luminance than in color, the U and V signals can be transmitted with reduced bandwidth with acceptable results.

In the receiver, a single demodulator can extract an additive combination of U plus V.  An example is the X demodulator used in the X/Z demodulation system.  In that same system, a second demodulator, the Z demodulator, also extracts an additive combination of U plus V, but in a different ratio.  The X and Z color difference signals are further matrixed into three color difference signals, (R-Y), (B-Y), and (G-Y).  The combinations of usually two, but sometimes three demodulators were:

In the end, further matrixing of the above color-difference signals c through f yielded the three color-difference signals, (R-Y), (B-Y), and (G-Y).

The R, G, and B signals in the receiver needed for the display device (CRT, Plasma display, or LCD display) are electronically derived by matrixing as follows: R is the additive combination of (R-Y) with Y, G is the additive combination of (G-Y) with Y, and B is the additive combination of (B-Y) with Y.  All of this is accomplished electronically.  It can be seen that in the combining process, the low-resolution portion of the Y signals cancel out, leaving R, G, and B signals able to render a low-resolution image in full color.  However, the higher resolution portions of the Y signals do not cancel out, and so are equally present in R, G, and B, producing the higher-resolution image detail in monochrome, although it appears to the human eye as a full-color and full-resolution picture.

NTSC and PAL systems 

In the NTSC and PAL color systems, U and V are transmitted by using quadrature amplitude modulation of a subcarrier.  This kind of modulation applies two independent signals to one subcarrier, with the idea that both signals will be recovered independently at the receiving end.  For NTSC, the subcarrier is at 3.58 MHz. For the PAL system it is at 4.43 MHz. The subcarrier itself is not included in the modulated signal (suppressed carrier), it is the subcarrier sidebands that carry the U and V information.  The usual reason for using suppressed carrier is that it saves on transmitter power.  In this application a more important advantage is that the color signal disappears entirely in black and white scenes.  The subcarrier is within the bandwidth of the main luminance signal and consequently can cause undesirable artifacts on the picture, all the more noticeable in black and white receivers.

A small sample of the subcarrier, the colorburst, is included in the horizontal blanking portion, which is not visible on the screen.  This is necessary to give the receiver a phase reference for the modulated signal.  Under quadrature amplitude modulation the modulated chrominance signal changes phase as compared to its subcarrier and also changes amplitude.  The chrominance amplitude (when considered together with the Y signal) represents the approximate saturation of a color, and the chrominance phase against the subcarrier reference approximately represents the hue of the color.  For particular test colors found in the test color bar pattern, exact amplitudes and phases are sometimes defined for test and troubleshooting purposes only.

Due to the nature of the quadrature amplitude modulation process that created the chrominance signal, at certain times, the signal represents only the U signal, and 70 nanoseconds (NTSC) later, it represents only the V signal.  About 70 nanoseconds later still, -U, and another 70 nanoseconds, -V.  So to extract U, a synchronous demodulator is utilized, which uses the subcarrier to briefly gate the chroma every 280 nanoseconds, so that the output is only a train of discrete pulses, each having an amplitude that is the same as the original U signal at the corresponding time.  In effect, these pulses are discrete-time analog samples of the U signal.  The pulses are then low-pass filtered so that the original analog continuous-time U signal is recovered.  For V, a 90-degree shifted subcarrier briefly gates the chroma signal every 280 nanoseconds, and the rest of the process is identical to that used for the U signal.

Gating at any other time than those times mentioned above will yield an additive mixture of any two of U, V, -U, or -V.  One of these off-axis (that is, of the U and V axis) gating methods is called I/Q demodulation.  Another much more popular off-axis scheme was the X/Z demodulation system.  Further matrixing recovered the original U and V signals.  This scheme was actually the most popular demodulator scheme throughout the 1960s.

The above process uses the subcarrier.  But as previously mentioned, it was deleted before transmission, and only the chroma is transmitted.  Therefore, the receiver must reconstitute the subcarrier.  For this purpose, a short burst of the subcarrier, known as the colorburst, is transmitted during the back porch (re-trace blanking period) of each scan line.  A subcarrier oscillator in the receiver locks onto this signal (see phase-locked loop) to achieve a phase reference, resulting in the oscillator producing the reconstituted subcarrier.

NTSC uses this process unmodified.  Unfortunately, this often results in poor color reproduction due to phase errors in the received signal, caused sometimes by multipath, but mostly by poor implementation at the studio end.  With the advent of solid-state receivers, cable TV, and digital studio equipment for conversion to an over-the-air analog signal, these NTSC problems have been largely fixed, leaving operator error at the studio end as the sole color rendition weakness of the NTSC system. In any case, the PAL D (delay) system mostly corrects these kinds of errors by reversing the phase of the signal on each successive line, and averaging the results over pairs of lines.  This process is achieved by the use of a 1H (where H = horizontal scan frequency) duration delay line. Phase shift errors between successive lines are therefore canceled out and the wanted signal amplitude is increased when the two in-phase (coincident) signals are re-combined.

NTSC is more spectrum efficient than PAL, giving more picture detail for a given bandwidth.  This is because sophisticated comb filters in receivers are more effective with NTSC's 4 color frame sequence compared to PAL's 8-field sequence.  However, in the end, the larger channel width of most PAL systems in Europe still gives PAL systems the edge in transmitting more picture detail.

SECAM system 
In the SECAM television system, U and V are transmitted on alternate lines, using simple frequency modulation of two different color subcarriers.

In some analog color CRT displays, starting in 1956, the brightness control signal (luminance) is fed to the cathode connections of the electron guns, and the color difference signals (chrominance signals) are fed to the control grids connections.  This simple CRT matrix mixing technique was replaced in later solid state designs of signal processing with the original matrixing method used in the 1954 and 1955 color TV receivers.

Synchronization
Synchronizing pulses added to the video signal at the end of every scan line and video frame ensure that the sweep oscillators in the receiver remain locked in step with the transmitted signal so that the image can be reconstructed on the receiver screen.

A sync separator circuit detects the sync voltage levels and sorts the pulses into horizontal and vertical sync.

Horizontal synchronization
The horizontal sync pulse, separates the scan lines.  The horizontal sync signal is a single short pulse that indicates the start of every line.  The rest of the scan line follows, with the signal ranging from 0.3 V (black) to 1 V (white), until the next horizontal or vertical synchronization pulse.

The format of the horizontal sync pulse varies.  In the 525-line NTSC system it is a 4.85 μs pulse at 0 V.  In the 625-line PAL system the pulse is 4.7 μs at 0 V.  This is lower than the amplitude of any video signal (blacker than black) so it can be detected by the level-sensitive sync separator circuit of the receiver.

Vertical synchronization

Vertical synchronization (also called vertical sync or VSync) separates the video fields.  In PAL and NTSC, the vertical sync pulse occurs within the vertical blanking interval.  The vertical sync pulses are made by prolonging the length of HSYNC pulses through almost the entire length of the scan line.

The vertical sync signal is a series of much longer pulses, indicating the start of a new field.  The sync pulses occupy the whole line interval of a number of lines at the beginning and end of a scan; no picture information is transmitted during vertical retrace.  The pulse sequence is designed to allow horizontal sync to continue during vertical retrace; it also indicates whether each field represents even or odd lines in interlaced systems (depending on whether it begins at the start of a horizontal line, or midway through).

The format of such a signal in 525-line NTSC is:
 pre-equalizing pulses (6 to start scanning odd lines, 5 to start scanning even lines)
 long-sync pulses (5 pulses)
 post-equalizing pulses (5 to start scanning odd lines, 4 to start scanning even lines)

Each pre- or post- equalizing pulse consists in half a scan line of black signal: 2 μs at 0 V, followed by 30 μs at 0.3 V.

Each long sync pulse consists of an equalizing pulse with timings inverted: 30 μs at 0  V, followed by 2 μs at 0.3  V.

In video production and computer graphics, changes to the image are often kept in step with the vertical synchronization pulse to avoid visible discontinuity of the image.  Since the frame buffer of a computer graphics display imitates the dynamics of a cathode-ray display, if it is updated with a new image while the image is being transmitted to the display, the display shows a mishmash of both frames, producing a page tearing artifact partway down the image.

Vertical synchronization eliminates this by timing frame buffer fills to coincide with the vertical blanking interval, thus ensuring that only whole frames are seen on-screen.  Software such as video games and computer-aided design (CAD) packages often allow vertical synchronization as an option, because it delays the image update until the vertical blanking interval.  This produces a small penalty in latency because the program has to wait until the video controller has finished transmitting the image to the display before continuing.  Triple buffering reduces this latency significantly.

Two-timing intervals are defined – the front porch between the end of the displayed video and the start of the sync pulse, and the back porch after the sync pulse and before the displayed video.  These and the sync pulse itself are called the horizontal blanking (or retrace) interval and represent the time that the electron beam in the CRT is returning to the start of the next display line.

Horizontal and vertical hold 
Analog television receivers and composite monitors often provide manual controls to adjust horizontal and vertical timing.

The sweep (or deflection) oscillators were designed to run without a signal from the television station (or VCR, computer, or other composite video source).  This provides a blank canvas, similar to today's "CHECK SIGNAL CABLE" messages on monitors: it allows the television receiver to display a raster to confirm the basic operation of the set's most fundamental circuits, and to allow an image to be presented during antenna placement.  With sufficient signal strength, the receiver's sync separator circuit would split timebase pulses from the incoming video and use them to reset the horizontal and vertical oscillators at the appropriate time to synchronize with the signal from the station.

The free-running oscillation of the horizontal circuit is especially critical, as the horizontal deflection circuits typically power the flyback transformer (which provides acceleration potential for the CRT) as well as the filaments for the high voltage rectifier tube and sometimes the filament(s) of the CRT itself.  Without the operation of the horizontal oscillator and output stages, for virtually every analog television receiver since the 1940s, there will be absolutely no illumination of the CRT's face.

The lack of precision timing components in early television receivers meant that the timebase circuits occasionally needed manual adjustment.
If their free-run frequencies were too far from the actual line and field rates, the circuits would not be able to follow the incoming sync signals.
Loss of horizontal synchronization usually resulted in an unwatchable picture; loss of vertical synchronization would produce an image rolling up or down the screen.

The adjustment took the form of horizontal hold and vertical hold controls, usually on the front panel along with other common controls.  These adjusted the free-run frequencies of the corresponding timebase oscillators.

Properly working, adjusting a horizontal or vertical hold should cause the picture to almost "snap" into place on the screen; this is called sync lock.  A slowly rolling vertical picture demonstrates that the vertical oscillator is nearly synchronized with the television station but is not locking to it, often due to a weak signal or a failure in the sync separator stage not resetting the oscillator.  Sometimes, the black interval bar will almost stop at the right place, again indicating a fault in sync separation is not properly resetting the vertical oscillator.

Horizontal sync errors cause the image to be torn diagonally and repeated across the screen as if it were wrapped around a screw or a barber's pole; the greater the error, the more "copies" of the image will be seen at once wrapped around the barber pole.  Given the importance of the horizontal sync circuit as a power supply to many subcircuits in the receiver, they may begin to malfunction as well; and horizontal output components that were designed to work together in a resonant circuit may become damaged.

In the earliest electronic television receivers (1930s–1950s), the time base for the sweep oscillators was generally derived from RC circuits based on carbon resistors and paper capacitors.  After turning on the receiver, the vacuum tubes in the set would warm up and the oscillators would begin to run, allowing a watchable picture.  Resistors were generally simple pieces of carbon inside a Bakelite enclosure, and the capacitors were usually alternating layers of paper and aluminum foil inside cardboard tubes sealed with bee's wax.  Moisture ingress (from ambient air humidity) as well as thermal instability of these components affected their electrical values.  As the heat from the tubes and the electrical currents passing through the RC circuits warmed them up, the electrical properties of the RC timebase would shift, causing the oscillators to drift in frequency to a point that they could no longer be synchronized with the received pulses coming from the TV station via the sync separator circuit, causing tearing (horizontal) or rolling (vertical).

Hermetically sealed passive components and cooler-running semiconductors as active components gradually improved reliability to the point where the horizontal hold was moved to the rear of the set first, and the vertical hold control (due to the longer period in the RC constant) persisted as a front panel control well into the 1970s as the consistency of larger-value capacitors increased.

By the early 1980s the efficacy of the synchronization circuits, plus the inherent stability of the sets' oscillators, had been improved to the point where these controls were no longer necessary.  Integrated Circuits which eliminated the horizontal hold control were starting to appear as early as 1969.

The final generations of analog television receivers (most TV sets with internal on-screen displays to adjust brightness, color, tint, contrast) used "TV-set-on-a-chip" designs where the receiver's timebases were divided down from crystal oscillators, usually based on the 3.58  MHz NTSC colorburst reference.  PAL and SECAM receivers were similar though operating at different frequencies.  With these sets, adjustment of the free-running frequency of either sweep oscillator was either physically impossible (being derived inside the integrated circuit) or possibly through a hidden service mode typically offering only NTSC/PAL frequency switching, accessible through the On-Screen Display's menu system.

Horizontal and Vertical Hold controls were rarely used in CRT-based computer monitors, as the quality and consistency of components were quite high by the advent of the computer age, but might be found on some composite monitors used with the 1970s–1980s home or personal computers.

There is no equivalent in modern television systems.

Other technical information

Components of a television system
A typical analog monochrome television receiver is based around the block diagram shown below:

The tuner is the object which "plucks" the television signals out of the air, with the aid of an antenna.  There are two types of tuners in analog television, VHF and UHF tuners.  The VHF tuner selects the VHF television frequency.  This consists of a 4 MHz video bandwidth and a 2  MHz audio bandwidth.  It then amplifies the signal and converts it to a 45.75 MHz Intermediate Frequency (IF) amplitude-modulated picture and a 41.25 MHz IF frequency-modulated audio carrier.

The IF amplifiers are centered at 44 MHz for optimal frequency transference of the audio and frequency carriers.  What centers this frequency is the IF transformer.  They are designed for a certain amount of bandwidth to encompass the audio and video.  It depends on the number of stages (the amplifier between the transformers).  Most of the early television sets (1939–45) used 4 stages with specially designed video amplifier tubes (the type 1852/6AC7).  In 1946 the RCA presented a new innovation in television; the RCA 630TS.  Instead of using the 1852 octal tube, it uses the 6AG5 7-pin miniature tube.  It still had 4 stages, but it was 1/2 the size.  Soon all of the manufactures followed RCA and designed better IF stages.  They developed higher amplification tubes, and lower stage counts with more amplification.  When the tube era came to an end in the mid-70s, they had shrunk the IF stages down to 1-2 (depending on the set) and with the same amplification as the 4 stage, 1852 tube sets.  Like radio, television has Automatic Gain Control (AGC).  This controls the gain of the IF amplifier stages and the tuner.  More of this will be discussed below.

The video amp and output amplifier consist of a low linear pentode or a high powered transistor.  The video amp and output stage separate the 45.75 MHz from the 41.25 MHz.  It simply uses a diode to detect the video signal.  But the frequency-modulated audio is still in the video.  Since the diode only detects AM signals, the FM audio signal is still in the video in the form of a 4.5 MHz signal.  There are two ways to attach this problem, and both of them work.  We can detect the signal before it enters into the video amplifier, or do it after the audio amplifier.  Many television sets (1946 to late 1960s) used the after video amplification method, but of course, there is the occasional exception.  Many of the later set late (1960s-now) use the before-the-video amplifier way.  In some of the early television sets (1939–45) used its own separate tuner, so there was no need for a detection stage next to the amplifier.  After the video detector, the video is amplified and sent to the sync separator and then to the picture tube.

The audio signal is detected by a 4.5 MHz traps coil/transformer.  After that, it then goes to a 4.5 MHz amplifier.  This amplifier prepares the signal for the 4.5Mhz detector.  It then goes through a 4.5 MHz IF transformer to the detector.  In television, there are 2 ways of detecting FM signals.  One way is by the ratio detector.  This is simple but very hard to align.  The next is a relatively simple detector.  This is the quadrature detector.  It was invented in 1954.  The first tube designed for this purpose was the 6BN6 type.  It is easy to align and simple in circuitry.  It was such a good design that it is still being used today in the Integrated circuit form.  After the detector, it goes to the audio amplifier.

The next part is the sync separator/clipper.  This also does more than what is in its name.  It also forms the AGC voltage, as previously stated.  This sync separator turns the video into a signal that the horizontal and vertical oscillators can use to keep in sync with the video.

The horizontal and vertical oscillators form the raster on the CRT.  They are kept in sync by the sync separator.  There are many ways to create these oscillators.  The first one is the earliest of its kind is the thyratron oscillator.  Although it is known to drift, it makes a perfect sawtooth wave.  This sawtooth wave is so good that no linearity control is needed.  This oscillator was for the electrostatic deflection CRTs.  It found some purpose for the electromagnetically deflected CRTs.  The next oscillator is the blocking oscillator.  It uses a transformer to create a sawtooth wave.  This was only used for a brief time period and never was very popular after the beginning.  The next oscillator is the multivibrator.  This oscillator was probably the most successful.  It needed more adjustment than the other oscillators, but it is very simple and effective.  This oscillator was so popular that it was used from the early 1950s until today.

The oscillator amplifier is sorted into two categories.  The vertical amplifier directly drives the yoke.  There is not much to this.  It is similar to an audio amplifier.  The horizontal oscillator is a different situation.  The oscillator must supply the high voltage and the yoke power.  This requires a high power flyback transformer, and a high powered tube or transistor.  This is a problematic section for CRT televisions because it has to handle high power.

Sync separator

Image synchronization is achieved by transmitting negative-going pulses; in a composite video signal of 1-volt amplitude, these are approximately 0.3  V below the "black level".  The horizontal sync signal is a single short pulse which indicates the start of every line.  Two-timing intervals are defined – the front porch between the end of the displayed video and the start of the sync pulse, and the back porch after the sync pulse and before the displayed video.  These and the sync pulse itself are called the horizontal blanking (or retrace) interval and represent the time that the electron beam in the CRT is returning to the start of the next display line.

The vertical sync signal is a series of much longer pulses, indicating the start of a new field.  The sync pulses occupy the whole of line interval of a number of lines at the beginning and end of a scan; no picture information is transmitted during vertical retrace.  The pulse sequence is designed to allow horizontal sync to continue during vertical retrace; it also indicates whether each field represents even or odd lines in interlaced systems (depending on whether it begins at the start of a horizontal line, or midway through).

In the television receiver, a sync separator circuit detects the sync voltage levels and sorts the pulses into horizontal and vertical sync.

Loss of horizontal synchronization usually resulted in an unwatchable picture; loss of vertical synchronization would produce an image rolling up or down the screen.

Counting sync pulses, a video line selector picks a selected line from a TV signal, used for teletext, on-screen displays, station identification logos as well as in the industry when cameras were used as a sensor.

Timebase circuits

In an analog receiver with a CRT display sync pulses are fed to horizontal and vertical timebase circuits (commonly called "sweep circuits" in the United States), each consisting of an oscillator and an amplifier.  These generate modified sawtooth and parabola current waveforms to scan the electron beam in a linear way.  The waveform shapes are necessary to make up for the distance variations from the electron beam source and the screen surface.  The oscillators are designed to free-run at frequencies very close to the field and line rates, but the sync pulses cause them to reset at the beginning of each scan line or field, resulting in the necessary synchronization of the beam sweep with the originating signal.  The output waveforms from the timebase amplifiers are fed to the horizontal and vertical deflection coils wrapped around the CRT tube.  These coils produce magnetic fields proportional to the changing current, and these deflect the electron beam across the screen.

In the 1950s, the power for these circuits was derived directly from the mains supply.  A simple circuit consisted of a series voltage dropper resistance and a rectifier valve (tube) or semiconductor diode.  This avoided the cost of a large high voltage mains supply (50 or 60 Hz) transformer.  This type of circuit was used for the thermionic valve (vacuum tube) technology.  It was inefficient and produced a lot of heat which led to premature failures in the circuitry.  Although failure was common, it was easily repairable.

In the 1960s, semiconductor technology was introduced into timebase circuits.  During the late 1960s in the UK, synchronous (with the scan line rate) power generation was introduced into solid state receiver designs. These had very complex circuits in which faults were difficult to trace, but had very efficient use of power.

In the early 1970s AC mains (50 or 60 Hz), and line timebase (15,625 Hz), thyristor based switching circuits were introduced.  In the UK use of the simple (50  Hz) types of power, circuits were discontinued.  The reason for design changes arose from the electricity supply contamination problems arising from EMI, and supply loading issues due to energy being taken from only the positive half cycle of the mains supply waveform.

CRT flyback power supply

Most of the receiver's circuitry (at least in transistor- or IC-based designs) operates from a comparatively low-voltage DC power supply.  However, the anode connection for a cathode-ray tube requires a very high voltage (typically 10–30 kV) for correct operation.

This voltage is not directly produced by the main power supply circuitry; instead, the receiver makes use of the circuitry used for horizontal scanning.  Direct current (DC), is switched through the line output transformer, and alternating current (AC) is induced into the scan coils.  At the end of each horizontal scan line the magnetic field, which has built up in both transformer and scan coils by the current, is a source of latent electromagnetic energy.  This stored collapsing magnetic field energy can be captured.  The reverse flow, short duration, (about 10% of the line scan time) current from both the line output transformer and the horizontal scan coil is discharged again into the primary winding of the flyback transformer by the use of a rectifier which blocks this negative reverse emf.  A small value capacitor is connected across the scan switching device.  This tunes the circuit inductances to resonate at a much higher frequency.  This slows down (lengthens) the flyback time from the extremely rapid decay rate that would result if they were electrically isolated during this short period.  One of the secondary windings on the flyback transformer then feeds this brief high voltage pulse to a Cockcroft–Walton generator design voltage multiplier.  This produces the required EHT supply.  A flyback converter is a power supply circuit operating on similar principles.

A typical modern design incorporates the flyback transformer and rectifier circuitry into a single unit with a captive output lead, (known as a diode split line output transformer or an Integrated High Voltage Transformer (IHVT)), so that all high-voltage parts are enclosed.  Earlier designs used a separate line output transformer and a well-insulated high voltage multiplier unit.  The high frequency (15 kHz or so) of the horizontal scanning allows reasonably small components to be used.

Transition to digital

In many countries, over-the-air broadcast television of analog audio and analog video signals has been discontinued, to allow the re-use of the television broadcast radio spectrum for other services such as datacasting and subchannels.

The first country to make a wholesale switch to digital over-the-air (terrestrial television) broadcasting was Luxembourg in 2006, followed later in 2006 by the Netherlands; in 2007 by Finland, Andorra, Sweden and Switzerland; in 2008 by Belgium (Flanders) and Germany; in 2009 by the United States (high power stations), southern Canada, the Isle of Man, Norway, and Denmark.  In 2010, Belgium (Wallonia), Spain, Wales, Latvia, Estonia, the Channel Islands, San Marino, Croatia, and Slovenia; in 2011 Israel, Austria, Monaco, Cyprus, Japan (excluding Miyagi, Iwate, and Fukushima prefectures), Malta and France; in 2012 the Czech Republic, Arab World, Taiwan, Portugal, Japan (including Miyagi, Iwate, and Fukushima prefectures), Serbia, Italy, Canada, Mauritius, the United Kingdom, the Republic of Ireland, Lithuania, Slovakia, Gibraltar, and South Korea; in 2013, the Republic of Macedonia, Poland, Bulgaria, Hungary, Australia, and New Zealand, completed the transition.  The United Kingdom made the transition to digital television between 2008 and 2012, with the exception of Whitehaven, which made the switch over in 2007. The first digital TV-only area in the United Kingdom was Ferryside in Carmarthenshire.

The Digital television transition in the United States for high-powered transmission was completed on 12 June 2009, the date that the Federal Communications Commission (FCC) set.  Almost two million households could no longer watch television because they had not prepared for the transition.  The switchover had been delayed by the DTV Delay Act. While the majority of the viewers of over-the-air broadcast television in the U.S. watch full-power stations (which number about 1800), there are three other categories of television stations in the U.S.: low-power broadcasting stations, class A stations, and television translator stations.  They were given later deadlines.  In broadcasting, whatever happens in the United States also influences southern Canada and northern Mexico because those areas are covered by television stations in the U.S.

In Japan, the switch to digital began in northeastern Ishikawa Prefecture on 24 July 2010 and ended in 43 of the country's 47 prefectures (including the rest of Ishikawa) on 24 July 2011, but in Fukushima, Iwate, and Miyagi prefectures, the conversion was delayed to 31 March 2012, due to complications from the 2011 Tōhoku earthquake and tsunami and its related nuclear accidents.

In Canada, most of the larger cities turned off analog broadcasts on 31 August 2011.

China is scheduled to end analog broadcasting between 2015 and 2018.

Brazil switched to digital television on 2 December 2007 in its major cities.  It is now estimated that Brazil will end analog broadcasting in 2023.

In Malaysia, the Malaysian Communications & Multimedia Commission (MCMC) advertised for tender bids to be submitted in the third quarter of 2009 for the 470 through 742  MHz UHF allocation, to enable Malaysia's broadcast system to move into DTV.  The new broadcast band allocation would result in Malaysia's having to build an infrastructure for all broadcasters, using a single digital terrestrial transmission/television broadcast (DTTB) channel. Large portions of Malaysia are covered by television broadcasts from Singapore, Thailand, Brunei, and Indonesia (from Borneo and Batam).  Starting from 1 November 2019, all regions in Malaysia were no longer using the analog system after the states of Sabah and Sarawak finally turned it off on 31 October 2019.

In Singapore, digital television under DVB-T2 began on 16 December 2013.  The switchover was delayed many times until analog TV was switched off at midnight on 2 January 2019.

In the Philippines, the National Telecommunications Commission required all broadcasting companies to end analog broadcasting on 31 December 2015 at 11:59 p.m.  Due to delay of the release of the implementing rules and regulations for digital television broadcast, the target date was moved to 2020.  Full digital broadcast is expected in 2021 and all of the analog TV services should be shut down by the end of 2023.

In the Russian Federation, the Russian Television and Radio Broadcasting Network (RTRS) disabled analog broadcasting of federal channels in five stages, shutting down broadcasting in multiple federal subjects at each stage.  The first region to have analog broadcasting disabled was Tver Oblast on 3 December 2018, and the switchover was completed on 14 October 2019.  During the transition, DVB-T2 receivers and monetary compensations for purchasing of terrestrial or satellite digital TV reception equipment were provided to disabled people, World War II veterans, certain categories of retirees and households with income per member below living wage.

See also

 Amateur television
 Narrow-bandwidth television
 Overscan
 Slow-scan television
 Terrestrial television
 Television transmitter
 Vertical blanking interval
 Field (video)
 Video frame
 Glossary of video terms

Notes

References

External links

 Video signal measurement and generation
 Television synchronisation
 Video broadcast standard frequencies and country listings
 EDN magazine describing design of a 1958 transistorised television receiver
 Designing the color television signal in the early 1950s as described by two engineers working directly with the NTSC

Film and video technology
History of television
Television technology
Television terminology